Trick or Treatment? Alternative Medicine on Trial (North American title: Trick or Treatment: The Undeniable Facts about Alternative Medicine) is a 2008 book by Simon Singh and Edzard Ernst. The book evaluates the scientific evidence for alternative medicines such as acupuncture, homeopathy, herbal medicine, and chiropractic, and briefly covers 36 other treatments. It finds that the scientific evidence for these alternative treatments is generally lacking. Homeopathy is concluded to be completely ineffective: "It's nothing but a placebo, despite what homeopaths say".

Although Trick or Treatment presents evidence that acupuncture, chiropractic and herbal remedies have limited efficacy for certain ailments, the authors conclude that the dangers of these treatments outweigh any potential benefits. Such potential risks outlined by the authors are contamination or unexpected interactions between components in the case of herbal medicine, risk of infection in the case of acupuncture and the potential for chiropractic manipulation of the neck to cause delayed stroke.

The book is very critical of Prince Charles' advocacy of alternative medicine and the actions of his now-defunct The Prince's Foundation for Integrated Health. Trick or Treatment is dedicated, in an ironic fashion, to the Prince.

Contents 
The book contains six chapters:

How do you determine the truth?
This chapter describes the methods and history of clinical trials, such as the trial to determine a proper treatment for scurvy by James Lind and the story of Florence Nightingale. James Lind was a British physician who pioneered naval hygiene. He recommended that citrus fruit and lemon juice should be included in the diets of seamen to eradicate the illness of scurvy. Lind was able to come to the conclusion that these remedies may reduce this particular illness through the various clinical trials he performed that were successful. Florence Nightingale is another example used in the novel as someone who practiced the scientific medicine and evidence based medicine as she pioneered the profession of nursing.

The truth about acupuncture
This chapter discusses the evidence surrounding acupuncture, a form of alternative medicine in which acupuncturists place needles in the body for the purpose of blocking Ch'i meridians throughout the body, thus encouraging full health. The authors examine the recent history of acupuncture and several various trials of the technique. The authors conclude that acupuncture is essentially a placebo.

The truth about homeopathy
This chapter discusses the evidence surrounding homeopathy, an alternative medicine technique which consists of finding a substance (which causes symptoms similar to the condition needing to be treated in a healthy person), then diluting that substance to an extreme degree. The chapter examines the history of homeopathy and reviews various trials regarding the technique, especially the trial done by Jacques Benveniste, a French researcher. The authors conclude that homeopathy is a placebo. The authors offered a £10,000 prize for anyone who could prove homeopathy was effective.

The truth about chiropractic therapy
This chapter discusses the evidence surrounding chiropractic, an alternative medicine technique which aims to cure illness by manipulating the spine, based on the theory that almost all conditions and diseases are caused by misaligned vertebrae in the spine block the body's vital force. The history of chiropractic, as well as several of the trials on chiropractic are described. The authors conclude that there is no evidence to support most of chiropractic's claims. However, the authors state that chiropractic might be beneficial in certain limited situations concerning back pain. As well, the authors find that chiropractic can be very dangerous, especially when it comes to the manipulation of the neck, and state that patients should "try conventional treatments before turning to a chiropractor for back pain. They are generally cheaper than spinal manipulation and just as likely to be effective."

The truth about herbal medicine
This chapter discusses the evidence surrounding herbal medicine, such as the use of St. John's Wort and Aloe vera. The authors conclude that several herbal medicines can be effective to treat illness, while others, such as billberry, chamomile, and ginseng, are ineffective.

Does the truth matter?
This chapter discusses the state of alternative medicine in society, focusing on Prince Charles's endorsements of alternative medicine.

Reception 
The book received generally good reviews. The New England Journal of Medicines review said this about the authors: "Simon Singh is a physicist and science journalist, and his coauthor, Edzard Ernst, is a physician and professor of complementary medicine. Ernst is one of the best qualified people to summarize the evidence on this topic." The Daily Telegraph found the book to be "a clearly written, scrupulously scientific examination of the health claims of key areas of alternative medicine: acupuncture, homeopathy, chiropractic therapy and herbal medicine. The results are stark. In no case, apart from in some limited ways in herbal medicine, do any of these 'therapies' work. On the contrary, they can be life-threatening." The journal Nature tempered a generally positive review with a concern that the authors' sense of certainty "mirrors that of the proponents of alternative therapies, leaving each position as entrenched as ever."

Trick or Treatment drew criticism from consumers and practitioners of alternative therapies. The British Journal of General Practice published a review by Jeremy Swayne (former dean of the Faculty of Homeopathy) that was critical of the book and its argument.

A review by Harriet A. Hall on Quackwatch stated that some negative reviews of Trick or Treatment demonstrated "an appalling poverty of thought"; articulating that since the reasoning behind the author's conclusions is solid, critics instead deny the methods of science, misrepresent the book's contents and use ad hominem attacks against the authors.

Subsequent libel case and freedom of speech 

Singh was sued for libel by the British Chiropractic Association (BCA) for comments he wrote in a column in The Guardian about the book. In 2010, after two years, the BCA dropped the case after the Court of Appeal found that Singh was expressing opinion, rather than stating facts. The presiding judges commented that "this litigation has almost certainly had a chilling effect on public debate which might otherwise have assisted potential patients to make informed choices about the possible use of chiropractic".

See also
 Suckers: How alternative medicine makes fools of us all, 2008 book by Rose Shapiro

References

External links 
 Simon Singh's website
 Edzard Ernst's website
 Trick or Treatment online at Open Library
 Trick or Treatment at Science-Based Medicine

2008 non-fiction books
Alternative medicine publications
Books by Simon Singh
British non-fiction books
English-language books
Health and wellness books
Medical books
Scientific skepticism mass media
Bantam Press books